Dennis Kempe (born 24 June 1986) is a German professional footballer who plays as a defender for  club Wehen Wiesbaden. He has previously played for Borussia Mönchengladbach II, VfL Wolfsburg II, 1. FC Kleve, FC Vaduz, VfR Aalen, Karlsruher SC and Erzgebirge Aue.

Club career

Early career
Born in Wesel, Kempe played youth football with TV Voerde and SuS Dinslaken before joining the academy of Borussia Mönchengladbach in 2002. Having made his senior debut for Borussia Mönchengladbach II in August 2006, Kempe played for VfL Wolfsburg II and 1. FC Kleve before signing for Liechtenstein based Swiss Challenge League club FC Vaduz in the summer of 2009. After making 12 league appearances across the 2009–10 season for Vaduz, Kempe joined 3. Liga club VfR Aalen on 2 September 2010 on a one-year contract.

Karlsruher SC
In the summer of 2011, Kempe joined Karlsruher SC on a one-year contract, with him making his debut for the club on 17 July 2011 in a 3–2 win at home to MSV Duisburg, He was a regular player for Karlsruhe during the first half of the season, but as a result of influenza, did not appear for the club during the second half of the season. Despite this, at the end of the 2011–12 season, following Karlsruhe's relegation to the 3. Liga , Kempe signed a new two-year contract with the club, lasting until 30 June 2014.

The 2012–13 season saw Kempe make 23 appearances in the 3. Liga, scoring thrice, as the club were promoted back to the 2. Bundesliga. On 18 September 2013, Kempe signed a two-year contract extension with Karlsruhe, keeping him at the club until 2016. Kempe remained a fairly regular player at Karlsruhe, though he often suffered from injuries that limited his playing time.

In April 2016, he extended his contract with Karlsruhe by a further two years. Across the 2016–17 season, he made 21 appearances for the club in the 2. Bundesliga as they were relegated back to the 3. Liga.

Erzgebirge Aue
He joined 2. Bundesliga side Erzgebirge Aue on a two-year contract in the summer of 2017, despite still having a year remaining on his contract at Karlsruhe. Over the course of the 2017–18 season, he made 25 appearances in the 2. Bundesliga, scoring once, whilst he made 17 appearances over the 2018–19 season, scoring once. In May 2019, his contract was extended by a further year to the summer of 2020. He was released at the end of the 2019–20 season.

Wehen Wiesbaden
In August 2020, Kempe joined newly relegated 3. Liga side Wehen Wiesbaden on a one-year contract.

International career
Kempe has played for Germany at under-16 and under-19 level.

Personal life
His father Thomas Kempe was also a professional footballer as is his younger brother Tobias.

References

External links
 
 
 

1986 births
Living people
People from Wesel
Sportspeople from Düsseldorf (region)
German footballers
Footballers from North Rhine-Westphalia
Association football defenders
Germany youth international footballers
Borussia Mönchengladbach II players
Swiss Challenge League players
2. Bundesliga players
3. Liga players
VfL Wolfsburg players
VfL Wolfsburg II players
FC Vaduz players
VfR Aalen players
Karlsruher SC players
FC Erzgebirge Aue players
SV Wehen Wiesbaden players
German expatriate footballers
German expatriate sportspeople in Liechtenstein
Expatriate footballers in Liechtenstein